Put Ilyicha is the name of several places:

In Russia 

 Put Ilyicha, Leninsky District, Volgograd Oblast
 Put Ilyicha, Nikolayevsky District, Volgograd Oblast
 Put Ilyicha, Pallasovsky District, Volgograd Oblast

Elsewhere 
Put Ilyicha, Kazakhstan, a village in the Almaty Province, Kazakhstan